The Granby River is a tributary of the Kettle River in British Columbia, Canada, joining the Kettle just north of the Canada–United States border at the town of Grand Forks.

Formerly known as the north fork of the Kettle River, the Granby River is named for the Granby Consolidated Mining & Smelting Company, which from 1898 to 1919 operated the Phoenix Mines and a smelter on the east side of the river. The new name was officially adopted in 1915.

References

Boundary Country
Monashee Mountains
Rivers of British Columbia